Santa Margarida is a village in the mid-north of São Tomé Island in São Tomé and Príncipe, part of the Mé-Zóchi District. Its population is 384 (2012 census). It lies 1 km southwest of Madalena and 4 km northwest of Trindade.

Population history

References

Populated places in Mé-Zóchi District